Martin Bogren (born 1967) is a Swedish documentary photographer, living in Malmö. He has made "understated books full of quietly observed moments shot in grainy black and white."

Bogren has had solo exhibitions of Lowlands and Italia at Fotografiska in Stockholm, Sweden, and of Ocean at Blue Sky Gallery in Portland, Oregon. Lowlands has also been shown in group exhibitions at Moderna Museet Malmö and Moderna Museet, Stockholm. His work is held in the collections of Fotografiska and of Portland Art Museum.

Life and work
Bogren grew up in Skurup, Skåne County (also known as Scania County), Sweden.

In the early 1990s he photographed bands and artists. He toured for several years with the Swedish pop group the Cardigans, making a "diaristic book", The Cardigans: Been it (1997). He has since established his signature style, making—in the words of Sean O'Hagan in The Guardian—"understated books full of quietly observed moments shot in grainy black and white." In Ocean (2008) "his subjects were a group of men from Rajasthan, who had travelled the 1,000-odd miles from their inland home by minibus to bathe in the sea for the first time." For Lowlands (2011), Bogren revisited his childhood home of Skurup over 4 years, "to portray the inhabitants, environments and atmosphere of the village", "a rural Swedish idyll peopled with strange and beautiful characters." For Tractor Boys (2013) "he immersed himself in the enclosed world of a group of adolescent boys from rural Sweden who customise and race old cars for fun." Italia (2016), made in Naples, Palermo, Bologna and Turin, is "Bogren's take on street photography". August Song (2020) was made during summers between 2013 and 2018, at music venues hidden in woods on the outskirts of villages in rural parts of Sweden. Passenger (2021) was made over several stays in Calcutta, India and for the first time mixes colour photographs with his usual black and white.

 Bogren lives in Malmö, Sweden.

Publications

Books of work by Bogren
The Cardigans: Been it. Tiden, 1997. .
Ocean. Finn Larsen, 2008. .
Lowlands. Max Strom, 2011. .
Tractor Boys. Stockport: Dewi Lewis, 2013. . With an essay by Christian Caujolle.
Italia. Max Ström, 2016. . Includes a short prose pamphlet by Bogren.
August Song. Bentivoglio, Italy: L'Artiere, 2020. . Edition of 1000 copies.
Passenger. Lamaindonne, 2021. .

Artist books by Bogren
Notes. Stockholm: Stockholms Fotoantikvariat, 2008. .
Embraces. Self-published, 2014. Edition of 150 copies.
Hollow. Self-published, 2018. Edition of 15 copies.

Exhibitions

Solo exhibitions
Ocean, Blue Sky Gallery, Portland, Oregon, 2009
Martin Bogren: Lowlands, Fotografiska, Stockholm, Sweden, 2011
Martin Bogren: Italia, Fotografiska, Stockholm, Sweden, 2016/17

Group exhibitions
A Way of Life: Swedish Photography from Christer Strömholm until Today, Moderna Museet Malmö, Malmö, Sweden, 2014; Moderna Museet, Stockholm, Sweden, 2014/15. With work by Christer Strömholm, Bogren, Anna Clarén, JH Engström, Kenneth Gustavsson, Gerry Johansson, Tuija Lindström, Anders Petersen, Inta Ruka, Gunnar Smoliansky, Lars Tunbjörk, and others.

Collections
Bogren's work is held in the following collections:
Fotografiska, Stockholm, Sweden
Portland Art Museum, Portland, Oregon

Notes

References

External links

Bogren's profile at Agence Vu

Documentary photographers
21st-century Swedish photographers
People from Skurup Municipality
Living people
1967 births